Gooburrum is a rural locality in the Bundaberg Region, Queensland, Australia. The neighbourhood of Tantitha is within the locality.

History 
St Mark's Anglican Church opened in 1880. It closed on 15 February 2020 following a service conducted by Bishop Jeremy Greaves, the Bishop of the Northern Region of the Brisbane Diocese. St Mark's Anglican Church is at 1280 Moore Park Road. The church's bell was donated by Misses M and V Aiken of "Rutherglen", where it has been used to summon the Kanaka labourers.

In 1887,  of land were resumed from the Tantitha pastoral run. The land was offered for selection for the establishment of small farms on 17 April 1887.

Gooburrum State School opened on 3 March 1884.

Geography
The Burnett River forms a small part of the eastern boundary.

Road infrastructure
Mount Perry Road (State Route 3) passes the south-west corner.

Education 
Gooburrum State School is a government primary (Prep-6) school for boys and girls at 14 Gooburrum Road. In 2017, the school had an enrolment of 132 students with 8 teachers (7 full-time equivalent) and 7 non-teaching staff (5 full-time equivalent).

There is no secondary school in Gooburrum. The nearest secondary school is in neighbouring Bundaberg North.

See also 
 Shire of Gooburrum

References

Further reading 
 
 
 

Bundaberg Region
Localities in Queensland